Asbury House is a historic home located at Hurricane, Putnam County, West Virginia. It was built about 1876, and is a two-story brick dwelling in the Greek Revival / I house style. It features a reconstructed small front portico with metal hip roof and columns.  In 1969, it was purchased as a parsonage by the Forrest Burdette United Methodist Church.  It was moved to a new location in 1994.

It was listed on the National Register of Historic Places in 1997.

References

Houses on the National Register of Historic Places in West Virginia
Houses in Putnam County, West Virginia
National Register of Historic Places in Putnam County, West Virginia
Houses completed in 1876
Greek Revival houses in West Virginia
I-houses in West Virginia